The De la Gardie campaign was a joint military campaign by the Tsardom of Russia and Sweden during the Polish–Muscovite War from April 1609 to June 1610.

Russia was unofficially occupied during the early Time of Troubles by the Polish–Lithuanian Commonwealth, which had supported False Dmitry II as the Tsar of Russia since 1607. Tsar Vasili IV formed a military alliance with Sweden in 1609, providing a 5,000-strong auxiliary corps commanded by Jacob De la Gardie and Evert Horn to support Russian forces under Mikhail Skopin-Shuisky. The De la Gardie campaign was successful against False Dmitry II, dispersing his court in Tushino – a former village and town to the north of Moscow, but failed against the Polish–Lithuanians and was defeated at the Battle of Klushino on 4 June 1610.

Prelude 
The Tsardom of Russia had been experiencing the Time of Troubles (1598–1613) since the death of Tsar Feodor I in 1598, causing widespread political instability and a violent succession crisis for the title of Tsar of Russia by usurpers known as the False Dmitris. In 1605, the Polish-Muscovite War started when the Polish–Lithuanian Commonwealth unofficially invaded Russia in support of False Dmitry I against the unpopular crowned tsar Boris Godunov, seeking to exploit the country's weakness for their own gain. Godunov died in June 1605 and was replaced by False Dmitry I, whose popularity among the Russian populace declined rapidly during his reign, and the Polish withdrew when he was eventually murdered during an uprising in Moscow in May 1606.

Despite this, Russia's instability continued to the near-total breakdown of order, prompting the Polish to invade again in 1607 in support of the new usurper, False Dmitry II. In 1609, the Tsar of Russia at the time, Vasili IV, approached King Charles IX of Sweden to form a military alliance against False Dmitry II and the Polish occupiers. The two signed the Treaty of Viborg (Vyborg; Finnish: Viipuri), in which Russia ceded Kexholm County and the strategic Korela Fortress to Sweden in exchange for military support. This Russian alliance formed in 1609 with Sweden, the main rival of Poland, led to King Sigismund III of Poland officially declaring war on Russia in response.

Campaign against False Dmitry II 

In 1608–1613, De la Gardie as Sweden's Chief Commander in Finland also commanded the Swedish war efforts in Russia. Thus, in accordance with the Swedish-Russian military alliance formed in 1609, he together with Evert Horn now took charge of providing an auxiliary corps to support the Russian forces commanded by Mikhail Skopin-Shuisky.

Although officially the Swedish-Russian alliance was not ratified before July 1609, already in the early spring of 1609 Sweden gathered for this mission to the city of Vyborg (Finnish: Viipuri) in Finland (then part of Sweden) c. 5,000 soldiers, consisting mainly of Finns. A Swedish offensive heading towards Moscow – via Novgorod – began from Vyborg on 11 March 1609. The operation became known as De la Gardie campaign. It was a joint military campaign by the Tsardom of Russia and Sweden during the Polish-Russian War (1605-1618), a.k.a. Polish–Muscovite War or the Dimitriads, lasting officially from April 1609 to 4 June 1610.

A combined Russo-Swedish army of about 10,000 soldiers set out from Novgorod in April 1609 and marched towards Moscow, defeating rebel forces and relieving the Siege of Troitse-Sergiyeva Lavra on their way. The De la Gardie campaign was successful against False Dmitry II, dispersing his court in Tushino, a former village and town to the north of Moscow, where Dmitry II maintained an alternative court, challenging the authority of Vasili IV. On 12 March 1610, the Russo-Swedish army broke the rebel siege of Moscow and conquered the city.

In the aftermath, some of the Tushino boyars summoned Wladyslaw IV to lay his claim to the Russian throne, while Skopin-Shuisky was poisoned at the behest of his uncle and rival, Prince Dmitry Shuisky.

Campaign against Polish–Lithuanian Commonwealth 

In June 1610, De la Gardie and Dmitry Shuisky departed from Moscow in order to lift the Polish–Lithuanian Siege of Smolensk. The campaign ended with most of De la Gardie's forces defecting to the Polish hetman Stanisław Żółkiewski at the Battle of Klushino in 1610. After this, De la Gardie's remaining army during that summer returned to Vyborg, Finland (then part of Sweden).

Aftermath 
In the Battle of Klushino, after all but 400 of his men rebelled and defected to the enemy, Jacob de la Gardie concluded a truce with Żółkiewski, in exchange for the right of passage with the army to Vyborg and the promise not to serve the Moscow Tsar. The De la Gardie campaign can be considered a prelude to the Ingrian War.

References 

Wars involving Poland
Wars involving Russia
Wars involving Sweden
Warfare of the Early Modern period
1610 in Sweden
Conflicts in 1610
Vasili IV of Russia
Polish-Swedish war
Battles of the Polish–Muscovite War (1605–1618)